The Spain national under-20 football team represents Spain in international football at this age level and is controlled by Royal Spanish Football Federation (RFEF), the governing body for football in Spain.

Competitive Record

FIFA U-20 World Cup
 Champions   Runners-up   Third Place   Fourth Place

*Denotes draws include knockout matches decided on penalty kicks.

Mediterranean Games

Individual awards
In addition to team victories, Spanish players have won individual awards at FIFA World Youth Cups.

Player records

Top appearances 

Note: Club(s) represents the permanent clubs during the player's time in the Under-20s.

Top goalscorers 

Note: Club(s) represents the permanent clubs during the player's time in the Under-20s.

Former squads
2013 FIFA under-20 World Cup squads – Spain
2011 FIFA under-20 World Cup squads – Spain
2009 FIFA under-20 World Cup squads – Spain
2007 FIFA under-20 World Cup squads – Spain
2005 FIFA under-20 World Cup squads – Spain
2003 FIFA under-20 World Cup squads – Spain
1999 FIFA under-20 World Cup squads – Spain
1997 FIFA under-20 World Cup squads – Spain
1995 FIFA under-20 World Cup squads – Spain
1991 FIFA under-20 World Cup squads – Spain
1989 FIFA under-20 World Cup squads – Spain
1985 FIFA under-20 World Cup squads – Spain
1981 FIFA under-20 World Cup squads – Spain
1979 FIFA under-20 World Cup squads – Spain
1977 FIFA under-20 World Cup squads – Spain

See also
Spain national football team
Spain national under-23 football team
Spain national under-21 football team
Spain national under-19 football team
Spain national under-18 football team
Spain national under-17 football team
Spain national under-16 football team
Spain national under-15 football team
Spain national youth football team

References

External links
siemprecantera 
Tournament archive at fifa.com
FIFA U-20 World Cup at rsssf
Squad listings of winning teams at rsssf

European national under-20 association football teams
Football